"Absence of the Heart" is a song written by Chris Farren, Chuck Jones, and co-written and recorded by American country music artist Deana Carter.  It was released in September 1998 as the lead-off single from album Everything's Gonna Be Alright.  The song was her most successful from the album; it peaked at number 16 on the Hot Country Singles & Tracks and was her fifth Top 10 hit on the Canadian Country charts.  "Absence of the Heart" became Carter's last single to chart on the U.S. Billboard Hot 100 to date.

Content
The song is a soft love ballad that features a light instrumentation with acoustic guitars. The song's lyrics speak of a narrator who realizes that there is an "absence of the heart" in her relationship.

We live together separately
We don't want to fall apart
But every time we kiss there's an emptiness
An absence of the heart

Music video 
The music video for "Absence of the Heart" was directed by Roger Pistole. In the video, Carter is seen singing the song while in various rooms of a house; she stands beside a metal-framed bed with newspapers flying around her, looking at herself in mirrors that are in various locations, and looking through glass that has water pouring down it.

Chart performance
"Absence of the Heart" spent a total of 20 weeks on the Billboard Hot Country Singles & Tracks chart, where it reached a peak position of number 16.

Year-end charts

References

1998 singles
Deana Carter songs
Country ballads
Songs written by Deana Carter
Songs written by Chris Farren (country musician)
Songs written by Chuck Jones (songwriter)
Capitol Records Nashville singles
Song recordings produced by Chris Farren (country musician)
1998 songs
1990s ballads